The Annamite Range or the Annamese Mountains (Phou Luang) is a major mountain range of eastern Indochina, extending approximately  through Laos, Vietnam, and a small area in northeast Cambodia. The mountain range is also referred to variously as Annamese Range, Annamese Mountains, Annamese Cordillera, Annamite Mountains and Annamite Cordillera. The French adopted the word and used "Annamese" or "Annamite" to refer to the Vietnamese.

The highest points of the range are the -high Phou Bia, the -high Phu Xai Lai Leng and the -high Ngọc Linh (Ngoc Pan).  The latter is located at the northwestern edge of the Triassic Kontum Massif in central Vietnam. Important mountain passes are the Nape Pass and the Mụ Giạ Pass.

The Annamite Range runs parallel to the Vietnamese coast, in a gentle curve which divides the basin of the Mekong River from Vietnam's narrow coastal plain along the South China Sea.  Most of the crests are on the Laotian side.  The eastern slope of the range rises steeply from the plain, drained by numerous short rivers. The western slope is more gentle, forming significant plateaus before descending to the banks of the Mekong.  The range itself has three main plateaus, from north to south: Phouane Plateau, Nakai Plateau and Bolaven Plateau.

Laos lies mostly within the Mekong basin, west of the divide, although most of Houaphan Province and a portion of Xiangkhoang Province (where the famous Plain of Jars is located) lie east of the divide.  Most of Vietnam lies east of the divide, although Vietnam's Tây Nguyên (Central Highlands) region lies west of the divide, in the Mekong basin.

Ecology
The Annamite mountains form an important tropical seasonal forest global ecoregion, the Annamite Range Moist Forests Ecoregion, which consists of two terrestrial ecoregions, the Southern Annamites montane forests and the Northern Annamites moist forests.

The range is home to rare creatures such as the recently discovered Annamite rabbit and the antelope-like saola, the Douc langur, the large gaur, the Chinese pangolin, and the Indochinese tiger.

History
Most of the highlands like the Annamite Range and the Central Highlands were populated by ethnic minorities who were not Vietnamese during the beginning of the 20th century. The demographics were drastically transformed with the mass colonization of 6 million settlers from 1976 to the 1990s, which led to ethnic Vietnamese Kinh outnumbering the native ethnic groups in the highlands.

See also
List of Ultras of Southeast Asia

References

External links 

 BBC In Pictures: Uncovering Viet Nam's secret wildlife
Cat Tien National Park
Paleoanthropology in mainland Southeast Asia; Tam Hang, Laos
Malaria in Montagnard country in Vietnam (French)

Mountain ranges of Vietnam
Mountain ranges of Laos
Ecoregions of Vietnam
Geography of Xiangkhouang province
Mountain ranges of Cambodia
Ecoregions of Laos
Ecoregions of Cambodia